Einar Jørum  (16 June 1924 – 10 September 1997) was a Norwegian football player and leader.

He was born in Åsen. He played for the clubs Rosenborg BK, Vålerenga Fotball,  Bodø/Glimt and Bardufoss during his active career from 1945 to 1959. He served as president of the Football Association of Norway  from 1970 to 1980.

References

1924 births
1997 deaths
People from Levanger
Norwegian footballers
Rosenborg BK players
Vålerenga Fotball players 
FK Bodø/Glimt players
Norwegian sports executives and administrators

Association footballers not categorized by position